Ádám Farkas (born 9 November 1987 in Budapest) is a Hungarian football forward player who plays for Nyíregyháza Spartacus.

Career
He made his Nemzeti Bajnokság I debut on 27 July 2012 in a 4–2 defeat to Szombathelyi Haladás

Club statistics

Updated to games played as of 15 September 2013.

External links

1987 births
Living people
Footballers from Budapest
Hungarian footballers
Association football forwards
Budaörsi SC footballers
Egri FC players
Nyíregyháza Spartacus FC players
Nemzeti Bajnokság I players